Bowman Creek is a  long tributary of the Susquehanna River in Luzerne County and Wyoming County, in Pennsylvania, in the United States. It has 26 named tributaries, of which 21 are direct tributaries and 5 are sub-tributaries. These include nineteen runs, six creeks, and one hollow (a stream that does not have a name of its own, but takes the name of the valley through which it flows).

The major tributaries of Bowman Creek include Sugar Hollow Creek, Marsh Creek, Leonard Creek, Roaring Run, and Beaver Run. Although the watershed of Bowman Creek largely consists of forested land, residential and commercial land infringes upon the floodplains of several tributaries: Marsh Creek, Leonard Creek, South Run, and Beaver Run.

Bowman Creek's main stem is designated as a High-Quality Coldwater Fishery and the watersheds of all but two of its tributaries have the same designation. The watersheds of the remaining two tributaries, Sorber Run and Cider Run, are designated as Exceptional Value waters, with standards even higher than those of High-Quality Coldwater Fisheries. Additionally, these two tributaries are the only Wilderness Trout Streams in Wyoming County. Wild trout naturally reproduce throughout all of the creek's tributaries. A total of ten named streams in the watershed of Bowman Creek are classified by the Pennsylvania Fish and Boat Commission as Class A Wild Trout Waters. Most hold this designation for brook trout only, but Sugar Hollow Creek and a section of Roaring Run hold the designation for rainbow trout, either instead of or in addition to brook trout.

Tributaries of Bowman Creek

Sub-tributaries

See also
List of rivers of Pennsylvania

References

External links

Bowman